The 1975–76 Los Angeles Kings season was the Kings' ninth season in the National Hockey League.

Offseason
The Kings were coming off their most successful season ever, built largely on the strength of their defense and goaltending. They ranked second in fewest goals allowed in the 1974–75 season, but tied for ninth in goals scored. In addition, while their penalty killing was excellent, their power play ranked in the lower third of the league.

Their early round playoff upset by Toronto (where the Kings scored only six goals in three games) prompted them to make one of the biggest trades in club history. High scoring superstar Marcel Dionne was in a contract dispute with the Detroit Red Wings and was available to a team that would meet his salary demands. So to bolster the offense, the Kings traded veteran defenseman and team captain Terry Harper and tough guy forward Dan Maloney along with draft picks to the Detroit Red Wings for future hall of famer Dionne and defenseman Bart Crashley. They then gave Dionne one of the richest contracts in NHL history up to that point at $300,000 per year.

Regular season
Unlike the prior season when the Kings started fast, after the first two games in 1975–76, they were 0–2–0 and had been outscored 16–0. It was later revealed that goaltender Rogie Vachon was playing with a flu-like virus related to typhus. Vachon recovered and the Kings won 10 of their next 12 games to right the ship. However, they played .500 hockey the rest of the way and finished 27 points behind the Montreal Canadiens in the Norris Division. While Dionne delivered a club record 40 goals and 94 points, the team missed Harper's leadership and defense, and Maloney's tough guy presence. A number of players missed significant time with injuries, and the club actually scored six fewer goals that the year before despite the addition of Dionne. The Kings ended up with a record of 38–33–9, second in the Norris Division and sixth overall in the league.

Post Season
The Kings mini series opponent was the Atlanta Flames. The Kings scored in the 1st minute of game one and went on to win 2–1 behind Vachon's brilliant goaltending. In game two, Atlanta tried to physically overwhelm the Kings but Vachon was even better than in game one; Bob Berry's third-period goal won the game 1–0 and the series; it was the Kings first playoff series win since 1969.

Boston Series
What followed the Atlanta series was one of the most memorable playoff series in Kings history. The Kings were big underdogs against the big, powerful, tradition rich Boston Bruins. Game one went according to form as the Bruins used their size advantage on the smaller rink at the Boston Garden and smothered the Kings, 4–0. Boston continued to dominate play in game two, but Rogie Vachon was brilliant and kept the Kings tied at two going into overtime. Butch Goring then stunned the Boston crowd with an overtime winner, and the teams flew to L.A. tied at a game apiece. One the larger ice surface at the Forum, the Kings' offense got going and, led by Marcel Dionne's hat trick, won game three by a score of 6–4. Suddenly the Kings led a series in which many thought they would get swept. Boston appeared to wake up and won games four and five, outscoring the Kings 10–1, and again seemed in control of the series. When the Kings skated onto the ice in game six back in L.A., the sellout crowd greeted them with a five-minute standing ovation that delayed the national anthem and the start of the game. Players on both sides said they had never seen anything like it. The game that followed was even more amazing. After a scoreless first period in which Vachon made numerous outstanding saves, the Kings' Tom Williams beat Gerry Cheevers over the glove hand on a wicked 55 foot slap shot to send the crowd into a frenzy. Boston came right back to tie the game, and then Vachon stopped Terry O'Reilly on a breakaway to keep the score 1–1. As the game wore on, the Bruins appeared to wear down the Kings and they took a 3–1 lead into the final five minutes. Mike Corrigan scored to make it 3–2, and with the crowd going crazy, Corrigan had another chance as he went for a rebound. Cheevers tripped him, but Corrigan swiped at the puck while lying on his stomach and put it in the net to tie the game. After Vachon made numerous great saves, the first overtime was winding down to its final minute when Butch Goring took a pass in the top of the slot and beat Cheevers, sending the crowd into a frenzy and the series back to Boston for the seventh game. Goring's game winner prompted Kings' hall of fame announcer Bob Miller's famous call "We're going back to Boston! We're going back to Boston! We're going back to Boston!" Goring was carried off the ice on his teammates' shoulders while the crowd continued to go crazy. In the seventh game, after a scoreless first period, Boston eventually wore down the Kings and won 3–0.

Final standings

Schedule and results

Playoffs
Mini Series
Kings 2 Flames 1
Kings 1 at Flames 0

Quarter Finals
Kings 0 at Bruins 4
Kings 3 at Bruins 2 (OT)
Kings 6 Bruins 4
Kings 0 Bruins 3
Kings 1 at Bruins 7
Kings 4 Bruins 3 (OT)
Kings 0 at Bruins 4

Player statistics

Awards and records

Transactions
The Kings were involved in the following transactions during the 1975–76 season.

Trades

Free agent signings

Free agent compensation

Intra-league draft

Draft picks
Los Angeles's draft picks at the 1975 NHL Amateur Draft held in Montreal, Quebec.

Farm teams

See also
1975–76 NHL season

References

External links

Los Angeles Kings seasons
Los Angeles Kings
Los Angeles Kings
Los
Los